Otter Lake is a lake located by Meridian, New York. Fish species present in the lake are black bullhead, and walleye. There is access with fee through the Leisure Acres Trailer Park.

References

Lakes of Cayuga County, New York
Lakes of New York (state)